Philippe Lacheau (born 25 June 1980) is a French actor, director and writer.

Career
From 2002 to 2010, Philippe Lacheau worked on French television for several TV Show like the "Casting Live" (2002), "Total Fun" (2003) and "Pour le meilleur et pour le fun" (2004). He also work with Karl Zéro on "C’est quoi ce jeu ?" (2004), Michel Denisot on Le Grand Journal (2005–07). In 2009, he is a part of the French Silent Library (TV series) produces by Christophe Dechavanne and he joined the team of Laurent Ruquier for a couple of his TV Show.

Filmography

Actor

Director / Writer

References

External links

1980 births
Living people
People from Fontenay-sous-Bois
French male film actors
21st-century French male actors
French film directors
French screenwriters